Franjo Rački (25 November 1828 – 13 February 1894) was a Croatian historian, politician and writer. He compiled important collections of old Croatian diplomatic and historical documents, wrote some pioneering historical works, and was a key founder of the Yugoslav Academy of Sciences and Arts.

Historian
Rački was born in Fužine, near Rijeka. He completed his secondary education in Senj and Varaždin. He graduated in theology in Senj, where he was ordained Catholic priest by the bishop Ožegović in 1852. Rački received his PhD in theology in Vienna in 1855.

His career as a historian began as soon as he started working as a teacher in Senj. An industrious man, full of patriotic fervor, Rački organized the research of Glagolitic documents on the islands of Kvarner. He often went to the village of Baška on Krk, the location of the famous Baška Tablet. After analyzing the tablet for a long time, he published Viek i djelovanje sv. Cirilla i Methoda slavjamkih apošlolov (The Age and Activities of Saints Cyril and Methodius, the Apostles among the Slavs).

He was moved from Senj to Rome in 1857. There he worked in the Croatian Institute of St Jerome for three years, in difficult circumstances. He went around Roman archives in search of documents on Croatian history. He also attended courses in paleography and related historical sciences.

In Rome he found many documents on Bogomils, collected by the Catholic Church during the medieval struggle against that heresy. Fifteen years later, Rački would publish Bogomili i Patareni, a milestone in the research on the Bosnian Church. In the book, Rački founded the "Bogomil hypothesis", saying that the Bosnian Church was influenced by the dualist heretic teachings from Bulgaria, originating in the 9th century. As it was very controversial and intriguing, that theory dominated research for most of the 19th and 20th centuries, but its general premises have been mostly refuted.

Although Rački is more important as a promoter of culture than as a historian, his original historical works are important for their pioneering nature and wealth of information. As well as the previously mentioned Bogomili i patareni, he wrote Povjesnik Ivan Lučić (The Historian Joannes Lucius), Nutarnje stanje Hrvatske prije XII. stoljeća (The Internal Organization of Croatia Before the 12th Century), Stari grb bosanski (The Old Bosnian Coat of Arms), Povelje bosanskog kralja Tvrtka (Documents of the Bosnian king Tvrtko). The pinnacle of his scientific work is the monumental Documenta historiae Croaticae periodum antiaquam illustrantia.

Academy

He started Književnik, the first Croatian scientific magazine for history and linguistics, and Obzor and Vijenac, very influential magazines for culture and politics. He was a key founder of the Yugoslavian Academy of Sciences and Arts and greatly contributed to the expansion of the University of Zagreb. Rački founded most editions of the Academy, which are published even today: Rad, Starine, and the Codex diplomaticus Regni Croatiae, Dalmatiae et Slavoniae, an exceptional monument of legal history. He founded the Academy library, archive and dictionary. His activities determined the work of the Academy for several decades, especially in its cultural and social aspects.

Politician
In 1861, as the church representative from Senj, he became a member of the Croatian Parliament, convened after a pause of 12 years. Along with Ante Starčević, Rački was the only peasant's child in the parliament.

Rački was a prolific political writer. He wrote about all the important Croatia-related topics and issues of his time. He promoted the merging of Dalmatia with Croatia ruled by the ban, he wrote discussions about the Croatian nature of Srijem and Rijeka, but he spent most energy on analyzing the relationships between Croatia and Hungary, fighting against the Hungarian expansionism. Along with the bishop Josip Juraj Strossmayer, Rački was a partisan of the idea of Yugoslavia. They both promoted the cultural and political unity of the South Slavs.

He died in Zagreb.

External links
 Franjo Rački 
 Život                 i djela Dra. Franje Račkoga 

1828 births
1894 deaths
People from Fužine, Croatia
19th-century Croatian historians
Representatives in the Croatian Parliament (1848–1918)
Members of the Croatian Academy of Sciences and Arts
Corresponding members of the Saint Petersburg Academy of Sciences
Burials at Mirogoj Cemetery